William Joseph Varner is a former American-Belgian professional basketball player. He played on several European clubs, including R.C. Mechelen.

College career 
Varner played college basketball at the University of Notre Dame, with the Notre Dame Fighting Irish. After, a poor performance at his first two college years, Varner has 10 points per game at his junior season, and 11,1 points average at his senior season.

Professional career 
Varner played at Continental Basketball Association (CBA) during 1983–84 season, with Sarasota Stingers and Wisconsin Flyers.

In 1984 signed with P.A.O.K. BC. Varner played two years only in European Cup, but his contribution was fabulous. At 1984–85 FIBA European Cup Winners' Cup second round PAOK eliminated KK Bosna Royal and Varner scored 35 points at the first leg, and 31 at the second. At group stage PAOK lost all the games, but Varner shone with 36 and 32 points against CB Zaragoza games, and 33 against BC Žalgiris in the away game.
In 1985–86 season Varner 1985–86 FIBA Korać Cup lead PAOK at group stage. At the first round after a 105–87 defeat from BC Levski Sofia, Varner scored 36 points and a goal-foul at the last second of the second game and gave the victory to his team with 104–83. At group stage Varner scored 35 against Auxilium Pallacanestro Torino, 30 against KK Zadar, and 33 against his later club Olympique Antibes.

Varner was named LNB Pro A MVP foreigner player for his performance with Olympique Antibes.

His best season of his career was with R.C. Mechelen He played six years from 1989 to 1995 and he won 5 consecutive Belgian Championships, and 3 Belgian Cups. At European competitions his best average was 24,2 points for 1991–92 FIBA European League. He also scored 39 points against CB Estudiantes on 11 February 1993. Varner was like a hero in Mechelen.

He also played in many clubs, such as Montpellier Paillade Basket, Valencia Basket, Spirou Charleroi, and Cantabria Baloncesto end his career at the age of 42.

References

External links 
at fibeurope.com
at sports-reference.com
at cholet-basket.com

1960 births
Living people
American expatriate basketball people in Belgium
American men's basketball players
Atléticos de San Germán players
Basketball players from Pennsylvania
Cholet Basket players
Cocodrilos de Caracas players
Gaiteros del Zulia players
Milwaukee Bucks draft picks
Montpellier Paillade Basket players
Notre Dame Fighting Irish men's basketball players
Olympique Antibes basketball players
P.A.O.K. BC players
Sarasota Stingers players
Spirou Charleroi players
Valencia Basket players
Wisconsin Flyers players
Small forwards